Jamaican cuisine includes a mixture of cooking techniques, flavours and spices influenced by Amerindian, African, Irish, English, French, Portuguese, Spanish, Indian, Chinese and Middle Eastern people who have inhabited the island. It is also influenced by the crops introduced into the island from tropical Southeast Asia, many of which are now grown locally. A wide variety of seafood, tropical fruits and meats are available.

Some Jamaican dishes are variations on cuisines brought to the island from elsewhere. These are often modified to incorporate local produce and spices. Others are novel or fusion and have developed locally. Popular Jamaican dishes include curry goat, fried dumplings, ackee and saltfish.
Jamaican patties along with various pastries, breads and beverages are also popular.

Jamaican cuisine has spread with emigrants, especially during the 20th century, from the island to other nations as Jamaicans have sought economic opportunities in other countries.

History

Development of the cuisine
African cuisine developed on the island as a result of waves of slavery, such as callaloo from the Angolan dish calulu. The fruit of the most popular Jamaican dish, ackee, was also brought to the Island by West African peoples. The Spanish, the first European arrivals to the island, contributed dishes such as the vinegary escovitch fish (Spanish escabeche) contributed by Spanish Jews. Later, the Cornish may have influenced the development of the Jamaican patty, a pasty-styled turnover filled with spiced meat.  More Chinese and East Indian influences can also be found in Jamaican cuisine like roti and curry goat as a result of indentured labourers who replaced slaves after emancipation brought their own culinary talents (especially curry, which Jamaican chefs sometimes use to season goat meat for special occasions). Salted codfish was brought by Portuguese Jews who had escaped the inquisition in the 1500s and now used in the national dish ackee and saltfish, but was also a staple for enslaved Africans as a long-lasting, affordable protein.

Jamaican cuisine and the Rastafarians
Jamaican cuisine includes Rastafarian influences but not entirely. Rastafarians have a vegetarian approach to preparing food, cooking, and eating, and have introduced a host of unique vegetarian dishes to the Jamaican cuisine. Rastafarians do not eat pork. However, pork is a very popular dish in Jamaica. Stew pork and jerk pork are some of the most popular ways to prepare it. There are even some who believe in cooking with little or no salt, which is referred to as the 'Ital' way.

Popular dishes

A Jamaican breakfast includes ackee and saltfish, seasoned callaloo, boiled green bananas, and fried dumplings.

Main courses

Soups

Beef soup
Chicken soup
Corn soup
Cow heel soup
Fish tea
Gungo peas soup
Janga soup
Mannish water
Pepperpot
Pumpkin soup
Red peas soup
Split pea soup

Side dishes

Bok choy
Breadfruit (boiled, fried or roasted)
Callaloo
Cooked rice
Dumplings (boiled or fried)
Festival 
Fried plantain
Fried rice
Green banana
Ground provisions
Macaroni pie
Potato salad
Rice and peas
Seasoned rice - pumpkin or callaloo plus spices
Stir-fry or steamed vegetables
Stew peas
Turned cornmeal

Breads and pastries

Bammy
Black cake
Bulla cake
Coco bread
Grotto
Hard dough bread
Peg bread
Rock cake
Rum cake
Spiced bun
Sugar bun

Beverages
Bigga and D&G sodas
Bush tea
Carrot juice with spices such as nutmeg and vanilla
Chocolate milk
Cocktails
D&G Malta
Fruit juices (cucumber, guava, mango, otaheite apple, pawpaw, pineapple, soursop, etc)
Ginger beer
Guinness punch with spices such as nutmeg and vanilla
Irish moss
Limeade
Liqueurs (Sangster's, Tia Maria, etc)
Mauby
Pimento dram
Red Stripe
Rums 
Sorrel
Supligen
Tamarind Fizz
Ting

Desserts and sweets

Mango and soursop ice cream are two popular desserts. Jamaican ice cream comes in many flavours like grapenut, rum and raisin and Dragon Stout.

Other popular desserts include batata pudding, cornmeal pudding, cassava pone, gizzada, grater cake, toto, banana fritters, coconut drops, plantain tarts and guava cheese.

Tie A Leaf, or blue drawers is a dish made by combining a starch (usually cornmeal or cassava) with coconut milk, then wrapped and tied in banana leaf before boiling.

Asham is parched corn that is ground and combined with brown sugar.

Tamarind balls are candy made with the sticky flesh of the fruit rolled with brown sugar into round sweet and sour balls. You can also make a spicy version that contains hot pepper in the mix.

Bustamante Backbone, named after the first Prime Minister Alexander Bustamante, is a candy.

Jamaican food abroad

Jamaican cuisine is available throughout North America, the United Kingdom, and other places with a sizeable Jamaican population. In the United States, a large number of restaurants are located throughout New York's boroughs, Atlanta, Fort Lauderdale, Washington DC, Philadelphia, and other metropolitan areas. In Canada, Jamaican restaurants can be found in the Toronto metropolitan area, as well as Vancouver, Montreal, and Ottawa. Jamaican dishes are also featured on the menus of Bahama Breeze, a US-based restaurant chain owned by Darden Restaurants.

Golden Krust Caribbean Bakery & Grill is a chain of about 120 franchised restaurants found throughout the U.S. These restaurants sell Jamaican patties, buns, breads, and other popular Jamaican dishes. They also supply food to several institutions in New York.

See also
 List of Jamaican dishes
 Caribbean cuisine

References

External links
 
 clixlr8.com - A Recipe Guide On How To Bake Jamaican Sweet Potato Pudding By Elaine A. Ayre

 
Caribbean cuisine
Articles containing video clips